An academic medical centre (AMC), variously also known as academic health science centre, academic health science system, or academic health science partnership, is an educational and healthcare institute formed by the grouping of a health professional school (such as a medical school) with an affiliated teaching hospital or hospital network.

AMCs are intended to ensure that medical research breakthroughs lead to direct clinical benefits for patients. The organisational structures that comprise an AMCs can take a variety of forms, ranging from simple partnerships to, less frequently, fully integrated organisations with a single management board. There are AMCs operating in a number of countries including Australia, Canada, the Republic of Ireland, Japan, the Netherlands, Qatar, Singapore, Sweden, the United Kingdom and the United States.

Australia
 Health Translation Queensland (Brisbane, Australia)
 Melbourne Academic Centre for Health (Melbourne, Australia)]
 Monash Partners Academic Health Science Centre (Melbourne, Australia)
 South Australian Academic Health Science and Translation Centre (Adelaide, Australia)
Sydney Health Partners (Sydney, Australia)
 Sydney Partnership for Health, Education, Research & Enterprise (Sydney, Australia)
 Western Australian Health Translation Network (Perth, Australia)
 Tropical Australian Academic Health Centre (North Queensland, Australia)

Canada

 Hamilton Health Sciences (Hamilton, Ontario)
 St. Joseph's Healthcare Hamilton (Hamilton, Ontario)
 Health Sciences North (Sudbury, Ontario)
 London Health Sciences Centre (London, Ontario)
 McGill University Health Centre (Montreal, Quebec)
 Centre Hospitalier de l'Université de Montréal (Montreal, Quebec)
 Sunnybrook Health Sciences Centre (Toronto, Ontario)
 The Ottawa Hospital (Ottawa, Ontario)
 Thunder Bay Regional Health Sciences Centre (Thunder Bay, Ontario)
 University Health Network (Toronto, Ontario)
 Vancouver Hospital and Health Sciences Centre (Vancouver, British Columbia)
 Winnipeg Health Sciences Centre (Winnipeg, Manitoba)

United Kingdom

Bristol Health Partners, Bristol
Cambridge University Health Partners, Cambridge
Imperial College Academic Health Science Centre, London
King's Health Partners, London
Manchester Academic Health Science Centre, Manchester
Newcastle Health Innovation Partners, Newcastle upon Tyne 
Oxford Academic Health Partners, Oxford
South East Wales Academic Health Science Partnership, Cardiff
UCLPartners, London

United States

 Albany Medical Center, Albany Medical College, Albany, New York
 Anschutz Medical Campus, University of Colorado School of Medicine, Aurora, Colorado
 BJC HealthCare, St. Louis, Missouri
 Boston Medical Center, Boston University, Boston, Massachusetts
 Cedars-Sinai Medical Center, Los Angeles, California
 Cleveland Clinic, Cleveland Clinic Lerner College of Medicine, Cleveland, Ohio
 Dartmouth-Hitchcock Medical Center, Geisel School of Medicine, Lebanon, New Hampshire
 Duke University Medical Center (Durham, North Carolina)
 Georgetown University Medical Center (Washington, DC)
 Intermountain Medical Center (Salt Lake City, Utah)
 Johns Hopkins Hospital (Baltimore, Maryland)
 Keck Hospital of USC (Los Angeles, California)
 Loma Linda University Health (Loma Linda, California)
 Massachusetts General Hospital, Brigham and Women's Hospital, and Beth Israel Deaconess Medical Center, Harvard Medical School (Boston, Massachusetts)
 Mayo Clinic, Mayo Clinic College of Medicine and Science (Rochester, Minnesota)
 Medical University of South Carolina, Charleston, South Carolina
 Memorial Medical Center and St. John's Hospital (Springfield, Illinois)
 National Academy of Medicine
 National Institutes of Health
 New York–Presbyterian Hospital, Columbia University and Cornell University, New York, New York
 NYU Langone Medical Center, New York University, New York, NY
 Ohio State University Wexner Medical Center, Ohio State University (Columbus, Ohio)
 Oregon Health & Science University, (Portland, Oregon)
 OSF Saint Francis Medical Center and the Children's Hospital of Illinois (Peoria, Illinois)
 Providence Alaska Medical Center (Anchorage, Alaska)
 Robert Wood Johnson University Hospital, Robert Wood Johnson Medical School (New Brunswick, New Jersey)
 Stony Brook University Hospital, Stony Brook University- State University of New York, Stony Brook, NY
 SUNY Downstate Medical Center, SUNY Downstate Health Sciences University, Brooklyn, NY
 Temple University Hospital, Temple University, Philadelphia, Pennsylvania
 Texas Medical Center (Houston, Texas)
 Thomas Jefferson University Hospital, Thomas Jefferson University, Philadelphia, Pennsylvania
 Tufts Medical Center (Boston, Massachusetts)
 UC Davis Medical Center (Sacramento, California)
 UC Irvine Medical Center (Orange, California)
 UCLA Health System (Los Angeles, California)
 UC San Diego Health (La Jolla, California)
 UCSF Medical Center (San Francisco, California)
 Uniformed Services University, (Bethesda, Maryland)
 University of Alabama at Birmingham, Alabama
 University of Chicago Medical Center, University of Chicago, Chicago, Illinois
 University of Connecticut Health Center, University of Connecticut, Farmington, Connecticut
 University of Cincinnati Medical Center (Cincinnati, Ohio)
 University of Florida Health (UF Health) (Gainesville and Jacksonville, Florida)
 University Hospitals Cleveland Medical Center (Cleveland, Ohio)
 University of Kentucky HealthCare (Lexington, Kentucky)
 University of Miami Health System (UHealth) (Miami, Florida)
 University of Michigan Health System, University of Michigan, Ann Arbor, Michigan
 University of Mississippi Medical Center, Mississippi
 University of North Carolina Hospitals (Chapel Hill, North Carolina)
 University of Pennsylvania Health System, Philadelphia, PA
 University of Pittsburgh Medical Center, Pennsylvania
 University of Tennessee Health Science Center (Memphis, TN)
 University of Texas Medical Branch (Galveston, Texas)
 University of Texas Southwestern Medical Center (Dallas, Texas)
 University of Utah Hospital, University of Utah (Salt Lake City, Utah)
 University of Vermont Medical Center, University of Vermont (Burlington, Vermont)
 University of Virginia Health System, Charlottesville, Virginia
 University of Wisconsin Hospital and Clinics, Madison, Wisconsin
Upstate University Hospital, Norton College of Medicine - State University of New York (Syracuse, New York)
 UW Medicine, University of Washington (Seattle, Washington)
 Vanderbilt University Medical Center, Nashville, Tennessee
 Vidant Medical Center, Brody School of Medicine at East Carolina University (Greenville, North Carolina)
 VCU Medical Center, Virginia Commonwealth University, Richmond, Virginia
 Wake Forest Baptist Medical Center, Winston-Salem, North Carolina
 Westchester Medical Center, Valhalla, New York
 Yale-New Haven Hospital, Yale University, New Haven, Connecticut

Other countries

 Academic Health System Universitas Gadjah Mada (Yogyakarta, Indonesia)
 Kyushu University Academic Medical Center (Fukuoka, Japan)
 Dublin Academic Medical Centre (Dublin, Ireland)
 Hamad Medical Corporation (Doha, Qatar)
 Karolinska Institutet (Stockholm, Sweden)
 Leiden University Medical Center (Leiden, the Netherlands)
 National University Health System (Singapore)
 Radboud University Nijmegen Medical Centre (Nijmegen, the Netherlands)
 SingHealth Duke-NUS Academic Medical Center, Singapore

See also
List of university hospitals
Medical school
Teaching hospital

References

External links
 Website Association of Academic Health Centers

 
Academic institutions by type